Nello Celio (12 February 1914 – 29 December 1995) was a Swiss politician from the Canton of Ticino. He was a member of the Free Democratic Party.  He was a member of the Federal Council from 1966 to 1973 and served as the President of the Swiss Confederation in 1972.

Biography 
Celio was born in Quinto, Ticino, Switzerland in 1914.  He studied law at the University of Basel and the University of Bern.  In 1944, he was appointed as a public prosecutor in the Sopraceneri area of Ticino.  He became active in politics as the president of the Ticino FDP and entered elective office in 1946 as a member of the Council of State of Ticino. He served in that body until 1959.

In 1960, he became the party president of the FDP. He stood for the 1963 Swiss federal election for the National Council and was elected.  After the Mirage Affair scandal, which resulted in the departure of Paul Chaudet from the Federal Council, Celio was elected to succeed him.  He initially headed up the Military Department, which was vacant after Chaudet's departure.  No other Federal Councilor at the tim was willing to take over the ministry.
In 1968, he took over the Department of Finance.

In 1971, he was the Vice President of Switzerland and in 1972, he served a single term as President of the Swiss Confederation. In 1973, he resigned from office.

Celio died on 29 December 1995 from pneumonia at the age of 81.

References

External links

 

|-

1914 births
1995 deaths
People from Ticino
Swiss Roman Catholics
Free Democratic Party of Switzerland politicians
Members of the Federal Council (Switzerland)
Finance ministers of Switzerland
Members of the National Council (Switzerland)